Metal Queen is the second studio album by singer Lee Aaron, released on February 24, 1984 through Attic Records. It reached #69 on the RPM Canadian Albums Chart and held that position for two weeks.

Track listing

Personnel
Lee Aaron – lead vocals
John Albani – guitar, background vocals
George Bernhardt – guitar, background vocals
Attila Demjen – drums
Frank Russell – drums
Jack Meli – bass, background vocals
Mick Walsh – engineering
Paul Gross – production

Chart performance

References

Lee Aaron albums
1984 albums
Attic Records albums